Kościelec  is a village in the administrative district of Gmina Krotoszyce, within Legnica County, Lower Silesian Voivodeship, in south-western Poland. Prior to 1945 it was in Germany.

The village has a population of 340.

References

Villages in Legnica County